The Federal Party is an Argentine political party founded by Francisco Manrique in 1973. 

It was intended to be the successor party to the military government created by coup d'etat in 1966 and known as the Argentine Revolution  of which its founder was a minister. For the March 1973 Argentine general election, they allied with the Democratic Progressive Party, which contributed the candidate for vice-president , obtaining a third-place showing with 14.9% of the votes.

From 1974 to 1976, it formed part of the opposition to Isabel Perón. In the 1983 Argentine general election, the first since the 1976 coup, it was part of the  In 1987, the party merged into Raúl Alfonsín's Convergencia Programática party, before separating from it once again.  In 1988, Manrique died and Guillermo Francos succeeded him as president, who resigned in favor of Martín Borrelli in 1998. Ten years later, the party was headed by Gustavo Forgione.

External links
Official website of the Federal Party

Provincial political parties in Argentina
Political parties established in 1973
1973 establishments in Argentina